Pavel Douglas (born 5 January 1951) is a Polish-born actor based in the United Kingdom.

Biography 
Douglas was born in Krakow, six years after the end of the Second World War, and was naturalised in 1959. By the end of the 1970s, having been brought up in Scotland and France, he made his first credited television debut with a small part in the television series Shoestring. In 1983, he appeared as a salesman in a training video for Austin Rover, alongside Nicholas Ball.

During the mid-1980s, Douglas was credited as "Captain" in two episodes of Robin of Sherwood. In 1988 and 1989, he appeared in several episodes of EastEnders as minor character Gregory Mantel, who was notably the character responsible for ordering the hit on Den Watts. He is also known for the role of Lord Alexander Felsham in the many series of BBC's Lovejoy (1986–93).

In December 1989, Douglas appeared on BBC 1's adaptation of The Voyage of the Dawn Treader as Lord Bern.

He has since taken on many more television and feature film roles including Charles Devon in Passport to Murder (1993), John "The Red" Comyn in The Bruce (1996), French Warship Captain in GoldenEye (1995), Nigel Wheeler in Heartbeat (1996), and Chris Duncan in Silent Witness (2006). He also provided the voices for Big-Ears and Mr. Plod in children's animated series, Make Way for Noddy in 2002. In 2007, he guest starred in Doctors, where he portrayed the role of Chief Superintendent Leo Jackson. This won him and the cast "Best Single Episode" at the 2007 British Soap Awards. As of 2007, he has appeared as Patrick Johnston in River City for BBC Scotland. In 2008, he appeared as Captain Lindeman in the television film "Krakatoa", in 2009 as Commander John McDowell in "Stockwell" for ITV, and in 2010 as Jonothan Owen in "Holby City" for the BBC.

In 2007, he appeared in the Channel 4 documentary Extraordinary Breastfeeding, where his wife explained why she was still breastfeeding their children as they were growing up.

Filmography

References

External links

1951 births
Living people
British male film actors
British male television actors
Naturalised citizens of the United Kingdom
Polish emigrants to the United Kingdom